Complete Control Recording Sessions is a live EP by The Bouncing Souls. It was recorded at Swing House Studios in Los Angeles, CA. It is the first in SideOneDummy's series The Complete Control Sessions. It was released digitally and on vinyl on April 12, 2011 . The artwork is by El Jefe Designs.

Track listing

Credits
Greg Attonito – vocals
Pete Steinkopf – guitar
Bryan Kienlen – bass
Michael McDermott – drums

References

The Bouncing Souls EPs
2011 EPs
SideOneDummy Records EPs